Divij Sharan and Vishnu Vardhan were the defending champions but decided not to participate.
Chen Ti and Huang Liang-Chi won the title over Jeong Suk-young and Nam Ji Sung 6–3, 6–2 in the final.

Seeds

Draw

Draw

References

 Main Draw

Doubles
Chang-Sat Bangkok Open - Doubles
 in Thai tennis